Radovan Kovacevic is a Serbian-American university professor. He is the director of the Southern Methodist University Research Center for Advanced Manufacturing. He holds several U.S. patents.

References

Living people
Southern Methodist University faculty
American people of Serbian descent
American scientists
Year of birth missing (living people)
Serbian engineers